Ogba–Egbema–Ndoni (also spelled Ogba/Egbema/Ndoni) is a Local Government Area of Rivers State, Nigeria (Old Ahoada LGA) under Rivers West Senatorial District, with its capital at Omoku. With about 258,700 People according to 2006 Census, It is bounded by Imo, Delta, Bayelsa, Abia and Anambra states and also by Ahoada West, Ahoada East and Emohua Local Government Areas of Rivers State. They are part of the Igboid speaking Areas of Rivers State with three Tribes starting with Ogba as the dominant tribe with 12 legislative wards and the Egbema and Ndoni Tribes with 2&3 legislative wards respectively. It is majorly upland and home to the highest upstream Oil and Gas exploration/exploitation activity in the State since early 1960's with about 12 mining/producing fields operated by AGIP, Total Energies and Shell/NPDC with many other reserve/untapped fields. It is part of the Ogba / Egbema / Ndoni / Ahoada West constituency of the Nigerian House of Representatives. Hon. Vincent Job is the Executive Chairman of ONELGA

The Ancient Traditional Stool of the Area is the, Oba of Ogbaland, The Nze-Obi of Egbema Kingdom and the Awor of Ndoni howeverso, recently, The Eze Egi of Egi Kingdom in Ogbaland was also adopted and elevated to First-Class Status joining the former as revered traditional institutions in the LGA.

From the Local Government, it is easy to Journey to the famous Onitsha World market through River Niger. The Local Government has vast arable and fertile land for Agricultural and industrial uses.

Population
The Ogba–Egbema–Ndoni Local Government Area is named after the three respective tribes who inhabit this territory, the Ogba, Egbemas whose brothers also occupy Ohaji/Egbema in Imo State, and the Ndoni people who are affiliated to their brothers in Ukwuani in Delta State and Ogbaru in Anambra State.

The indigenes are renowned as great farmers and fishermen, with a rich cultural history.

The area has produced prominent sons and daughters, including: Dr Peter Odili, (former Governor of Rivers State), Late Chief Godspower Ake, Professor Claude Ake, Senator Francis John Ellah, The Hon. Victor Igwe Masi (former Minister for Works and Minister of Finance), Chief Ibe Eresia Eke (who was the first LGA chairman after the creation of Onelga from old Ahoada LGA), Chief Oris Onyiri Agnes Okoh, Felix A. Obuah (PDP politician), Hon. Emmanuel Nwabrije, the Oba of Ogba Land, HRM Nnam Chukwumela Obi, Ambassador Chief C.D. Orike, The Osanakpo family notable as industrialist and within the business & legal circle, Prof. A. Wokocha, Senator Wilson Asinobi Ake, Senator F.J.Ellah, Matthew L. Onyije, Prince (Dr.) Shedrack Akolokwu, Mr Valentine Odili Akponor (Jnr), Kanayo C. Johnson,  Hon. Christian Ahiakwo, Dr. (Mrs) Grace Akolokwu, Prince Uche Nnam Obi, Shedrack Chukwu, Hon. Emmanuel Nwabrije, Olisa Akponor(CEO Bridgeport Support Services), Pona (Musician), KING STUNNA (musician), Chief William Ododo Oputa(Director of Marina Hotel, Onitsha) and Peter Paul(Olisanekwu Nduka) of Nismindisi Investment Group, Nigeria are from Ndoni area of the LGA.

Social-cultural life: the three ethnic groups find in the local government has different cultures, languages, and behaviour. they have a different colorful festival with masquerades. they entertain visitors and organise different social gathering. they are good in wrestling and football.
Production: The Ogba Egbema Ndoni Local Government Area is  one of the largest oil and gas producers in Rivers State.

References

Rivers State Newspapers Corporation- Eminent Persons of Rivers State (2013)

Local Government Areas in Rivers State
1991 establishments in Nigeria
1990s establishments in Rivers State